Dot. is an animated children's television series based on the book by Randi Zuckerberg. The series debuted on CBC Kids in Canada on September 6, 2016. The series later premiered on Universal Kids (then known as Sprout) in the United States on October 22, 2016. It has also been shown on Tiny Pop in the UK since 2017.

In January 2018, Dot. was renewed for a second season, which premiered on October 6, 2018.

Plot
Dot. follows the adventures, and some misadventures of an energetic eight-year-old  ball of energy who uses technology in solving problems and exploring the world around her with her friends; Hal, Ruby, Nev, and Dev, along with her dog, Scratch.

Characters

Main
 Dot Comet (voiced by Lilly Bartlam) is an energetic and tech-savvy eight-year-old  who loves to explore the world. Her name is a play on the .com domain name. She wears a pink dotty dress and she has short curly dark blue hair.
 Scratch Comet (voiced by Terry McGurrin) is Dot's best dog.
 Hal (voiced by Isaiah Slater) is Dot's best friend. He says he likes to role play.
 Ruby Marshall (voiced by Grace Oliver) is a blonde girl with glasses. In "Super Ruby" she is revealed to wear hearing aids.
 Nev Jumelle (voiced by Abigail Oliver) is the sister of Dev.
 Dev Jumelle (voiced by Ethan Tavares) is the brother of Nev.

Recurring
  Mrs. Comet (voiced by Denise Oliver) is Dot's mom. She sang the song Oh Chanukah with her daughter. As a child she lived with her father in the home where the Comets presently live.
  Mr. Comet (voiced by Terry McGurrin) is Dot's dad. He sang the song Up on the House Top with his daughter.
 Grandpapa (voiced by René Lemieux) is Dot's maternal grandfather.
 Anne is Dot's maternal grandmother.
 Nana (voiced by Lynne Griffin) is Dot's paternal grandmother.
 Greg is Hal's brother. He speaks in the episode "Hal In One", but his voice actor is uncredited.
 Mrs. Marshall (voiced by Nicki Burke) is Ruby's mother.
 Mr. Jumelle (voiced by Anand Rajaram) is the father of Nev and Dev, appearing alone in "Remembering Ogopogo" and "Garden Stakes", and accompanied by an unknown female in "DramaRama".
 Knight (voiced by Juan Chioran)
 Judge (voiced by Terry McGurrin)
 Mr. Sherman (voiced by Art Hindle) is an old neighbor.
 The Rangeroo Leader (voiced by Helen King) is a digital nature guide on Dot's tablet who educates her about the wilderness, often pre-empting her dad. In "Garden Stakes" Dot and Hal talk to her in person, calling her Rangeroo Leader Kerry.
 Stellakazam (voiced by Denise Oliver) is a stage magician who performed at Ruby's birthday party in which Dot was too sick to attend.

Production
The first season, consisting of 52 episodes, was broadcast on October 22, 2016. A second season was ordered on January 26, 2018, which consisted 26 episodes.

Episodes

Season 1 (2016–2017)

Season 2 (2018)

Do's & Dots (2016)
A series of shorts called "Do's and Dots" was available on Universal Kids' website in 2016.

Broadcast
Dot. premiered on JimJam in Pan-Europe on May 1, 2017. The series will also air on Canal Panda in Portugal, Piwi+ in France, and SVT in Sweden sometime in 2017. Hulu also acquired exclusive SVOD rights to Dot. and the series became available to stream on April 15. The show is currently airing on ABC Kids in Australia, Tiny Pop in United Kingdom and Clan TVE, Super3 and Nickelodeon in Spain.

Reception
It got a 5 out of 5 on Common Sense Media, quoting:

"Parents need to know that Dot. is based on a picture book by Randi Zuckerberg and centers on a curious 8-year-old who uses technology, math, and science concepts to learn new things, but it's never at the expense of real-world experiences and the people she cares about. For Dot and her family, it's all about balance, so much attention is given to the times when she acknowledges she's ready to unplug. The show sets out to expose kids -- and girls in particular -- to science, technology, engineering, and math (STEM) concepts in an inviting, age-appropriate way through the likable, self-confident titular character. As a bonus, it presents Dot's parents as her role models and educator, and her friends as positive influences in her life."

Media information
An HTML game called Dot's Rangeroo Scavenger Hunt is available on Kids' CBC and Universal Kids's websites. Another game, inspired by Atari's earliest arcade game Pong, Make a Game with Dot, is available on the Universal Kids website as well. An app, inspired by Wikipedia, Dotopedia, for Android and iOS devices was also released on December 12, 2016.

References

External links

 on Industrial Brothers

2010s American animated television series
2016 American television series debuts
2018 American television series endings
2010s Canadian animated television series
2016 Canadian television series debuts
2018 Canadian television series endings
American children's animated adventure television series
American preschool education television series
American television shows based on children's books
Animated television series about children
2010s preschool education television series
Animated preschool education television series
Canadian children's animated adventure television series
Canadian preschool education television series
Canadian television shows based on children's books
English-language television shows
CBC Television original programming
Television series by The Jim Henson Company
CBC Kids original programming